Picún Leufú is a department located in the east of Neuquén Province, Argentina.

Geography
The Department limits with Confluencia Department at northeast, Rio Negro Province at southeast, Collón Curá Department at southwest, Catán Lil Department at west and Zapala Department at northwest.  

Departments of Neuquén Province